Sophia of Saxe-Weissenfels (2 August 1684, Weissenfels - 6 May 1752, near Hotzenplotz in Roßwald) was a German aristocrat and culture patron, Countess of Brandenburg-Bayreuth by marriage to George William, Margrave of Brandenburg-Bayreuth.

Life 
Sophia was a daughter of Johann Adolf I, Duke of Saxe-Weissenfels (1649-1697) by his first wife Johanna Magdalena of Saxe-Altenburg (1656-1686), daughter of Frederick William II, Duke of Saxe-Altenburg. This made her a princess of Saxe-Weissenfels and a member of the Albertine branch of the House of Wettin.

In Leipzig on 16 October 1699 Sophia herself married George William, Margrave of Brandenburg-Bayreuth (1678-1726), who she had met during a visit to the Leipzig Fair earlier the same year. She thus became margravine of Brandenburg-Bayreuth. Soon afterwards he founded his own court, giving him the opportunity to build the Schloss Erlangen.

Sophia had considerable influence on cultural life in Bayreuth, which was described as the finest venue for singspiel in Germany. Sophia brought her love for German-language opera to Weissenfels, making it the only theatre which exclusively showed German-language works. However, her spending on festivities and culture increased the state's debt. In 1705 the foundation stone was laid for a new church in the St. Georgen district of the city - it was dedicated to Hagia Sophia after her.
Sophia was described as superficial, and her marriage proved unhappy. Her dalliance with a Swedish baron irritated George William that he attacked the baron at table with a stick and had his wife taken to Plassenburg. 

After her husband's death, she moved to Schloss Erlangen, where she lived for 8 years. She remarried on 14 July 1734 to Albert Joseph, Count of Hoditz and Wolframitz (1706-1778), twenty-two years her junior, making her reichsgräfin (imperial countess) of Hoditz and Wolframitz. . To marry him Sophia converted to Catholicism and as a result she was granted an annual pension from the imperial court in Vienna. After her death in 1752 Sophia was cremated - this was the first cremation in a German-speaking country since their occurrence in non-Christian parts of the German Empire in the 13th century.

Issue 
By her first marriage to George William, she had five children:
 Christiane Sophie Wilhelmine (1701–1749)
 Christian Wilhelm (*/† 1706)
 Eberhardine Elisabeth (1706–1709)
 Christian Friedrich Wilhelm (*/† 1709)
 Franz Adolf Wilhelm (*/† 1709)

Bibliography (in German) 
 Dieter J. Weiss: Barock in Franken, J. H. Röll, Dettelbach 2004, S. 86 f. 
 Martin Schieber: Erlangen: eine illustrierte Geschichte der Stadt, Verlag C. H. Beck, München 2002, S. 49 
 Johann G. Mayer: Nachrichten von der politischen und ökonomischen Verfassung des Fürstenthums, S. 11 ff. 
 E.C. von Hagen (ed.): Archiv für Geschichte und Alterthumskunde von Oberfranken, Volumes 5-6, Bayreuth 1851, S. 4 ff. 
 Hans-Joachim Böttcher: Christiane Eberhardine - Prinzessin von Brandenburg-Bayreuth, Kurfürstin von Sachsen und Königin von Polen. Dresdner Buchverlag 2011. .

References 

House of Saxe-Weissenfels
1684 births
1752 deaths
Albertine branch
Daughters of monarchs